Harold Keith Thompson (September 17, 1922 – March 3, 2002) was a New York City-based corporate executive, a Nazi agent, and a figure within American far-right and fascist circles.

Biography
Thompson was born in New Jersey in 1922.

Nazi activism 
Thompson began his political activism in his teenage years, joining the German American Bund and the America First Committee, and campaigning against involvement before America's entry into World War II. He came to the attention of Nazi Germany and was appointed as a Special Agent of the Sicherheitsdienst (SD) Overseas Intelligence Unit on July 27, 1941, swearing a loyalty oath to Adolf Hitler.

Postwar 
Thompson graduated from Yale University in 1946. He made an expedition to Antarctica as part of Operation Highjump under Rear Admiral Richard Evelyn Byrd.

Alongside his political activities, Thompson found work in public relations and owned a PR firm by the 1950s. 

The writer Stephen E. Atkins describes Thompson as "the intermediary between American prewar Nazism and the postwar neo-Nazism". Thompson befriended the German Nazi Otto Skorzeny, who had been Hitler's commando leader, and worked with him to set up ODESSA. Thompson also became a close ally of Otto Ernst Remer, a Nazi general who had defended Hitler against a 1944 coup plot, and in 1951, Thompson registered with the United States Department of Justice as the American representative for the German neo-Nazi Socialist Reich Party co-founded by Remer, a position Thompson held until the group was banned in 1952. Around the same time, he became involved with the National Renaissance Party, the American neo-Nazi party founded by James Madole. Thompson campaigned with Francis Parker Yockey for Remer's release from prison during the 1950s. Thompson and Yockey remained close allies until the latter's death in 1960. Thompson also ran a campaign to release Karl Dönitz, Hitler's successor. Thompson worked with neo-Nazi presses in South America to distribute literature covertly in Germany.

In his article "I Am an American Fascist" for the obscure Exposé magazine in 1954, Thompson praised the Third Reich and Hitler and condemned the Nuremberg Trials as "vicious and vilely dishonorable". He became linked to the International Association for the Advancement of Ethnology and Eugenics and published a number of pamphlets on its behalf.

Thompson visited Cairo in an attempt to forge links to the Nasser regime. More concrete links were established with Mohammad Amin al-Husayni and Johann von Leers as part of efforts to build the ties of the extreme right in the West and the Islamic world.

Republican Party and later work 
Along with a number of right wing activists Thompson was also involved on the fringes of the Republican Party. Independently wealthy, he contributed to the campaigns of such right wing figures in the GOP as Jesse Helms, Oliver North and Pat Buchanan. His monetary contributions to the party were such that he was awarded membership of its Presidential Legion of Merit as a result.

In his later years, Thompson largely disappeared from public view. In the wake of the Oklahoma City bombing he re-emerged, initially welcoming the attack; afterward, however, he later revised his position and denounced it as a government act designed to destroy the reputation of the far right.

He died in 2002.

Writing
In the early post-war years, Thompson worked as a publisher and literary agent (his clients included Fulgencio Batista, Carol II of Romania and Hans-Ulrich Rudel). He later become a writer for Journal of Historical Review, with articles including Grand Admiral Karl Doenitz: Last President of a United Germany. A subsequent book, Dönitz at Nuremberg: A Re-Appraisal, was also edited by Thompson. Thompson was offered a position on the board of policy of the Liberty Lobby, although he turned it down, stating that he only wanted to take one loyalty oath in his life (to Hitler when he joined the SD).

References

External links
 FBI files on H. Keith Thompson, obtained under the FOIA and hosted at the Internet Archive:
FBI headquarters file part 1
FBI headquarters file part 2
FBI headquarters file part 3
New York office file part 1
New York office file part 2
Washington field office file

1922 births
20th-century American businesspeople
American male non-fiction writers
American neo-Nazis
American political writers
2002 deaths
People from New Jersey
Yale University alumni
American public relations people
New York (state) Republicans
20th-century American male writers